The Israel women's national football team represents Israel in international women's football. The Israel women's national football team was established in 1997. Women's Football in Israel was developed as an upside down pyramid by first opening the national team and then after 2 years opening the first women's football league in Israel. Women's Football in Israel is struggling to develop because it is lacking investment.

History

Women's football in Israel first appeared in 1970, with several clubs being formed in the following years. However, these clubs folded, except for the M.I.L.N (Moa'don Israeli LeKaduregel Nashim (lit. Israeli Club for Women's Football)), which continued touring and playing exhibition matches in Israel and abroad. During this period a team representing Israel played a match against Netherlands, losing 0–12.

In 1997, following FIFA orders, the IFA established a women's national team ahead of the 1999 FIFA women's World Cup. Rony Schneider was appointed as team manager and supervised a series of trials, which resulted in a 26 women squad, which played its first official match against Romania on 2 November 1997.

As of April 2015, the national team played 95 matches (31 wins, 7 draws, 57 losses), scoring 111 goals. The team is yet to make an appearance in either the World Cup or the Women's Euro.

FIFA world rankings

Results and fixtures

 The following is a list of match results in the last 12 months, as well as any future matches that have been scheduled.

Legend

2022

Coaching staff

Current coaching staff
 Source: Team Staff of Israel, Football.org.il

Manager history
  Rony Schneider (1997–2003)
  Alon Schreier (2003–2008)
  Meir Nachmias (2008–2017)
  Guy Azouri (2017–2019)
  Gabriel Burstein (2019–2021)
  Gili Landau (2021–2022)
  Sharon Avitan (2022)
  Erez Belfer (2022–)

Players

Current squad
 The following players were called up for the 2023 FIFA World Cup qualifying matches against Bulgaria and Serbia on 1–6 September 2022.

Recent call ups
 The following players received a call-up within the last twelve months.

Records

 Active players in bold, statistics correct as of 25 November 2021.

Most capped players
 Source: Appearances in the team, Football.org.il

Top goalscorers

 Source: All-time scorers in the team, Football.org.il

Competitive record
 Champions   Runners-up   Third place   Fourth place

FIFA Women's World Cup

*Draws include knockout matches decided on penalty kicks.

Israel was entered into the UEFA Group 8 qualifying round, finishing in fourth place.
Standings

Matches

Israel was entered into the UEFA Group 7 qualifying round, finishing in third place.
Standings

Matches

Israel was entered into the UEFA Group 8 qualifying round, finishing in third place.

In addition to Israel competing, Israeli referee Rachel Cohen worked the Group 3 match between Belgium and Finland, and Group 4 between Republic of Ireland and Scotland.
Standings

Matches

Israel was entered into the UEFA Group 6 qualifying round, finishing in fourth place.

In addition to Israel competing, Israeli referee Lilach Asulin worked the Group 1 match between Northern Ireland and Estonia.
Standings

Matches

Roster
Coach: Meir Nachmias
Merav Shamir
Michal Ravitz
Moran Lavi
Adva Tawil
Sarit Shenar
Tal Shino
Moran Fridman
Or Erez
Shirli Ohana
Oshrat Eni
Tali Hanan
Sapir Kadori
Shay Sade
Naama Cohen
Lee Sima Falkon
Ortal Shamilov
Yifat Cohen
Sivan Fhima

Goalscorers
1 goal
Or Erez
Caroline Abbé
Yifat Cohen
Danielle Sofer

Israel competed in the UEFA Group 3 qualifying round, finishing in fourth place.

In addition to Israel competing, Israeli referee Lilach Asulin worked the Group 1 match between Slovenia and Republic of Ireland, Group 4 between Northern Ireland and Faroe Islands, Group 5 between Albania and Belgium, and Group 7 between Bulgaria and Finland.

Standings

Matches

Current squad
Coach: Meir Nachmias
Hanit Schwartz
Mairav Shamir
Maya Barqui 
Na'ama Cohen
Shani David
Moran Fridman
Michal Ravitz
Shay Sade (Captain)
Daniel Sofer
Lee Falkon
Tal Isaev
Moran Lavi
Shir Levo
Diana Redman
Sapir Sarusi
Karin Sendel (Captain)
Arava Shahaf
Adva Twil
Shelly Israel
Roni Shimrich

Goalscorers
2 goals
Lee Falkon
Moran Fridman
Daniel Sofer

1 goal
Rachel Shelina Israel
Moran Lavi

UEFA Women's Championship

*Draws include knockout matches decided on penalty kicks.

Israel was entered into the Group 7 qualifying round, finishing in fourth place.

Standings

Matches

Goalscorers
2 goals
Inna Didich

1 goal
 Silvi Jan
 Keren Knafo
 Sarit Shenar

Israel was entered into the Group 6 qualifying round, finishing in second place.

Standings

Matches

Goalscorers
7 goals
 Silvi Jan

4 goals
 Meital Dayan

3 goals
 Shirley Ohana

1 goal
 Tamara Kochen
 Sarit Shenar
 Inna Didich
 Rachel Shelina Israel 
 Ayala Truelove

Standings

Matches

Goalscorers
6 goals
Sarit Shenar

2 goals
Silvi Jan

1 goal
Sivan Fahima

Standings

Matches

Goalscorers
1 goal
Or Erez
Rachel Shelina Israel
Shirli Ohana

Israel was entered into the Group 4 qualifying round, finishing in fourth place.

Standings

Matches

Goalscorers
1 goal
Moran Lavi

1 own goal
Oshrat Eni 
Michal Ravitz

Roster
Coach: Meir Nachmias
Merav Shamir
Michal Ravitz
Diana Redman
Naama Cohen
Sarit Shenar
Rachel Shelina
Adva Tawil
Moran Fridman
Oshrat Eni
Moran Lavi
Lee Sima Falkon
Sapir Kadori
Tal Isaev
Yifat Cohen
Tal Mahlev
Maya Barqui
Tal Shino
Tal Sofer

Israel was entered into the Group 8 qualifying round, and finished in last place.
Standings

Matches

Goalscorers
1 goal
Lee Falkon
Rachel Shelina Israel

1 own goal
Maya Barqui

Roster

Source:

See also

Sport in Israel
Football in Israel
Women's football in Israel
Israel women's national under-19 football team
Israel women's national under-17 football team
Israel national football team

References

External links
Israel women's national football team – official website 
FIFA profile

 
European women's national association football teams
national